The men's 1500 metre freestyle was a swimming event held as part of the swimming at the 1924 Summer Olympics programme. It was the fourth appearance of the event, which was established in 1908. The competition was held on Sunday July 13, 1924, on Monday July 14, 1924, and on Tuesday July 15, 1924.

Records
These were the standing world and Olympic records (in minutes) prior to the 1924 Summer Olympics.

In the third heat Boy Charlton set a new Olympic record with 21:20.4 minutes, but in the next heat Arne Borg bettered his own world record to 21:11.4 minutes. In the final both swimmers were under the standing world record with Boy Charlton bettered the record by more than a minute to 20:06.6 minutes.

Results

Heats

Sunday July 13, 1924: The fastest two in each heat and the fastest third-placed from across the heats advanced.

Heat 1

Heat 2

Heat 3

Heat 4

Heat 5

Semifinals

Monday July 14, 1924: The fastest two in each semi-final and the faster of the two third-placed swimmer advanced to the final.

Semifinal 1

Semifinal 2

Final

Tuesday July 15, 1924:

References

External links
Olympic Report
 

Swimming at the 1924 Summer Olympics
Men's events at the 1924 Summer Olympics